Manwani is a surname. Notable people with the surname include:

Harish Manwani (born 1952), Indian chief operating officer
Mehak Manwani (born 1996), Indian actress

Indian surnames